Kristally is a 1948 Soviet 3-D film directed by Yakov Kaplunov. It was made by Mosnauchfilm, and is a documentary about how crystals are formed. It was also the first 3-D popular science film with graphic animation.

Cast
Leonid Khmara as Narrator

External links

1948 films
1940s 3D films
1940s Russian-language films
Soviet popular science films
Soviet documentary films
1948 documentary films
Soviet black-and-white films
Soviet 3D films
Black-and-white documentary films